O22 or O-22 may refer to:
 Columbia Airport (California)
 Douglas O-22, an observation aircraft of the United States Army Air Corps
 , a submarine of the Royal Netherlands Navy
 Otoyol 22, a motorway in Turkey
 Oxygen-22, an isotope of oxygen